Clifton Hugh Lancelot de Verdon Wrottesley, 6th Baron Wrottesley (born 10 August 1968), is an Irish sportsman and British peer and Conservative member of the House of Lords.

Early life
Wrottesley was born at Hatch Street, Dublin, in 1968 to the Hon.  Richard Francis Gerard Wrottesley and his wife, Georgina Wrottesley, née Clifton, daughter of Lt. Col. Peter Clifton of Dummer House, Hampshire, and his wife, Patricia Mary Adela Clifton, née Gibson-Watt, of Doldowlod House, Radnorshire.

His first two years were spent in Abbyknockmoy, County Galway.  After his father's death, he moved to Spain with his mother.

He was educated at Eton College, Edinburgh University and Royal Military Academy Sandhurst before serving in the Grenadier Guards.

Through his paternal grandmother he is a descendant of the Stratford family, and through his maternal grandfather the Clan Bruce.  He inherited the Wrottesley titles in 1977 upon the death of his grandfather, his father having died when he was two. He became eligible to sit in the House of Lords on his 21st birthday.

Career
Wrottesley works in property and fine wine.

Wrottesley was Chair of British Skeleton from 2012 to 2017, was a board member of the British Bobsleigh and Skeleton Association (BBSA) from 2012 to 2019, and Chair from 2012 to 2014. He is still involved in overseeing the British Skeleton World Class Programme, and Chairs the Selection Committee.

In March 2021, Wrottesley was appointed Chair of Ice Hockey UK (IHUK), and in January 2022 was appointed to the International Ice Hockey Federation (IIHF) Finance Committee for a period of 5 years.

Sporting career

Skeleton 
Wrottesley competed as an Irish skeleton racer on the Fédération Internationale de Bobsleigh et de Tobogganing (FIBT, now the International Bobsleigh and Skeleton Federation or IBSF) Skeleton Continental circuits in the 2000–01 season and the FIBT World Cup circuit in the 2001–02 season.  He finished fourth in the men's skeleton at the 2002 Winter Olympics.  As of 2022, this remains the best result of any Irish athlete at the Olympic Winter Games.

Wrottesley and his father both competed in bobsleigh for Great Britain before competing for Ireland.

During the 2006 Winter Olympics in Turin, he served as Chef de Mission for the Irish team.

Cresta Run 
Wrottesley is also a rider of the Cresta Run, St Moritz, Switzerland.  He has ridden on the Run since the 1988–89 season, won his Cresta colours in 1996, and has won many of the Open races since his first victory in 1997 (although he did not compete on the Run in the 2000–01 and 2001–02 seasons, due to commitments on the IBSF Skeleton circuits).

Of the 4 Classic Races on the Cresta Run, Wrottesley has won The Curzon Cup (the Blue Riband event of the season from Junction) a record 12 times (beating Nino Bibbia's record of 8), The Morgan Cup a record 15 times (beating Franco Gansser's record of 10), The Brabazon Trophy a record 15 times and the Grand National (the Blue Riband event of the season from Top) a record 15 times (beating Nino Bibbia and Franco Gansser's record of 8).

Wrottesley has also won The Grand Slam a record 5 times (all 4 Classic races in the one season), in 2003, 2005, 2006, 2010 and 2012.

Wrottesley holds the record for the number of Classic races won with a total of 57 to date, was the first person ever to break the 50 second barrier (on 1 February 2015) and in doing so holds the World Record from Top (49.92 seconds). Wrottesley also holds the Flying Junction Record (31.44 seconds).

Personal life
He lives in St Moritz, Switzerland, and Henley-on-Thames, England.  He is married to Sascha Wrottesley (née Schwarzenbach), Lady Wrottesley, the daughter of Urs Schwarzenbach, the Swiss billionaire financier.  The couple have four children: three sons and a daughter.

After voluntary declarations by Wrottesley to HM Revenue and Customs, HMRC issued tax demands for 2000 to 2008 on the basis that Wrottesley was domiciled in the UK. Wrottesley has appealed, contending that his domicile of origin is in the Republic of Ireland.  The first-tier tribunal issued a preliminary ruling but  had not issued a final decision in the case, so the matter is effectively in abeyance.

Political career
Removed from the House of Lords in 1999 under the provisions of the House of Lords Act which abolished hereditary peers' automatic memberships, Baron Wrottesley won a by election to the House of Lords in 2022, taking Baron Swinfen's room.

References

External links

Irishshop.com
2002 men's skeleton results
BBC.co.uk profile during the 2002 Winter Olympics
RTE article on Wrottesley
Skeletonsport.com profile
FIBT results archive
The St. Mortiz Tobogganing Club (SMTC) Annual Report 2011-2012
Link to SMTC website
The Irish Times, 5 February 2013

1968 births
Living people
People educated at Eton College
Alumni of the University of Edinburgh
British male skeleton racers
Irish male skeleton racers
Skeleton racers at the 2002 Winter Olympics
Olympic skeleton racers of Ireland
Wrottesley, Clifton Wrottesley, 6th Baron
Grenadier Guards soldiers
Conservative Party (UK) hereditary peers
Wrottesley
Wrottesley